Rhyd-y-foel is a small village near the coast of north Wales in the area of Rhos in the County Borough of Conwy, Wales.

It is named after the old ford (Welsh: rhyd) over the River Dulas.

It lies at the foot of the western slopes of Pen y Corddyn Mawr, an Iron Age hillfort on the River Dulas, about a mile south of the village of Llanddulas. It is a rural area, with Abergele to the east and Betws yn Rhos to the south.

Notes

External links 

www.geograph.co.uk : photos of Rhyd y Foel and surrounding area

Llanddulas and Rhyd-y-Foel
Villages in Conwy County Borough